Synod of Paris or Council of Paris may refer to:

Council of Paris (556×573)
Council of Paris (573)
Council of Paris (577)
Council of Paris (614)
Council of Paris (653)

Council of Meaux–Paris (845–846)